Dasteh Qich (also Romanized as Dasteh Qīch; also known as Dastāqīch, Dasht-e Qīch, Dastghich, and Dast Qīch) is a village in Momenabad Rural District, in the Central District of Sarbisheh County, South Khorasan Province, Iran. At the 2006 census, its population was 46, in 18 families.

References 

Populated places in Sarbisheh County